David Andrew Polkinghorne (born 20 April 1964) is a South African banker and former first-class cricketer.

Polkinghorne studied in England as a Rhodes Scholar at Pembroke College, Oxford. While studying at Oxford, he made three appearances in first-class cricket for Oxford University in 1988, playing against Hampshire, Kent and Nottinghamshire.

References

External links

1964 births
Living people
Cricketers from Durban
South African Rhodes Scholars
Alumni of Pembroke College, Oxford
South African cricketers
Oxford University cricketers
South African bankers
South African chief executives
Alumni of Kearsney College